Byblos Port is an ancient port in Byblos, Lebanon and is believed by the Lebanese to be oldest port in the world. Around 3000 BC, Byblos Port was the most important timber shipping center in the eastern Mediterranean. It was used by the Phoenicians to ship  their local wine, Cedars of Lebanon and other wood to the Pharaohs of Ancient Egypt to be used in tomb construction and shipbuilding.

External links
Byblos information

Ports_and_harbors_of_Lebanon
Ports and harbours of the Arab League
Transport in the Arab League